Priesneriana is a genus of thrips in the family Phlaeothripidae.

Species
 Priesneriana kabandha
 Priesneriana laticeps
 Priesneriana uptoni

References

Phlaeothripidae
Thrips
Thrips genera